Callambulyx junonia, the eyed pink-and-green hawkmoth, is a species of moth of the family Sphingidae first described by Arthur Gardiner Butler in 1881.

Distribution 
It is known from Bhutan, Nagaland in north-eastern India, southern China and northern Vietnam.

Description 
The wingspan is about 104 mm. It can be distinguished from all other Callambulyx species by the presence of a complete eyespot on the hindwing upperside.

References

Callambulyx
Moths described in 1881